Chaly, Chalyy, Chalii or Chalyi (masculine),  Chalaya (feminine) may be an East Slavic surname. It is derived from the nickname which literally means "Roan" (a horse coat color pattern). The surname may also have other origins. Notable people with the surname include:

Slavic
Aleksei Chaly (born 1961), Russian businessman and administrator
Nikita Chaly (born 1996), Russian football forward
 (born 1970), Belarusian economist and commenter
Timofey Chalyy (born 1994), Russian hurdler
 Valeriy Chaly (diplomat) (born 1970), Ukrainian diplomat
 Valeriy Chaly (footballer) (born 1958), Ukrainian-Russian football coach and former player

Other
Shaji Paul Chaly (1961), Indian judge

See also

Chal (name)
Charly (name)

East Slavic-language surnames